Ancylodactylus is a genus of diurnal (day) geckos in the family Gekkonidae. The genus is endemic to Africa.  Most of the species in the genus Ancyclodactylus were formerly assigned to the genus Cnemaspis.

Species
A. africanus (F. Werner, 1895) – African gecko
A. alantika (Bauer, Chirio, Ineich & LeBreton, 2006)
A. barbouri (Perret, 1986) – Barbour's gecko
A. chyuluensis Malonza & Bauer, 2022
A. dickersonae (Schmidt, 1919) – Dickerson's forest gecko, four-lined forest gecko
A. dilepis (Perret, 1963) – two-scaled gecko
A. elgonensis (Loveridge, 1936) – Mount Elgon forest gecko
A. gigas (Perret, 1986) – Perret's Nigeria gecko, giant forest gecko
A. kenyaensis Malonza & Bauer, 2022
A. kituiensis Malonza & Bauer, 2022
A. koehleri (Mertens, 1937) – Koehler's gecko
A. laikipiensis Malonza & Bauer, 2022
A. mathewsensis Malonza & Bauer, 2022
A. occidentalis (Angel, 1943) – western gecko
A. petrodroma (Perret, 1986) – Nigeria crag gecko, Ondo forest gecko
A. quattuorseriatus (Sternfeld, 1912) – Sternfeld's gecko
A. spawlsi Malonza & Bauer, 2022
A. spinicollis L. Müller, 1907 
A. uzungwae (Perret, 1986) – Tanzania gecko

Nota bene: A binomial authority in parentheses indicates that the species was originally described in a genus other than Ancyclodactylus.

References

 
Reptiles of Africa
Lizard genera
Taxa named by Lorenz Müller